Pitcher House may refer to:

Pitcher House (Mount Vernon, Indiana)
Pitcher-Goff House, Pawtucket, Rhode Island